Kükürd (also, Kyukyurd) is a village in the Gadabay Rayon of Azerbaijan.

References 

Populated places in Gadabay District